Idaho Legislative District 12 is one of 35 districts of the Idaho Legislature. It is currently represented by Todd Lakey, Republican of Nampa, Robert Anderst, Republican of Nampa, and Rick Youngblood, Republican of Nampa.

District profile (1992–2002) 
From 1992 to 2002, District 12 consisted of a portion of Canyon County.

District profile (2002–2012) 
From 2002 to 2012, District 12 consisted of a portion of Canyon County.

District profile (2012–2022) 
District 12 currently consists of a portion Canyon County.

District profile (2022–) 
Beginning in December 2022, District 12 will consist of a portion Canyon County.

See also

 List of Idaho Senators
 List of Idaho State Representatives

References

External links
Idaho Legislative District Map (with members)
Idaho Legislature (official site)

12
Canyon County, Idaho